Cass Township is one of twenty-one townships in LaPorte County, Indiana. As of the 2010 census, its population was 1,833 and it contained 757 housing units.

History
Cass Township was established in 1848. It was named for Lewis Cass, Democratic candidate in the 1848 United States presidential election.

Geography

References

External links
 Indiana Township Association
 United Township Association of Indiana

Townships in LaPorte County, Indiana
Townships in Indiana